Hermiston Municipal Airport  is a city-owned, public-use airport located two nautical miles (3.7 km) southeast of the central business district of Hermiston, in Umatilla County, Oregon, United States.

Although most U.S. airports use the same three-letter location identifier for the FAA and IATA, this airport is assigned HRI by the FAA and HES by the IATA.

Facilities and aircraft 
It has one runway designated 5/23 with an asphalt surface measuring 4,500 by 75 feet (1,372 x 23 m).

For the 12-month period ending September 1, 2017, the airport had 13,240 aircraft operations, an average of 36 per day.  At that time there were 38 aircraft based at this airport: 31 single-engine piston, 1 multi-engine piston, 5 Turboprop, and 1 Turbojet.

References

External links 
 Aerial photo as of 7 May 1994 from USGS The National Map
 

Airports in Umatilla County, Oregon
Hermiston, Oregon